Four ships of the Hellenic Navy have borne the name Katsonis (Κατσώνης), after the 18th-century naval commander Lambros Katsonis:

 a Town-class light cruiser that was never delivered due to the outbreak of World War I and served in the British Royal Navy as 
 , an ex-US GUPPY-IIA boat, in service 1973–1993
 , a Type 214 submarine, in service since 2016

Hellenic Navy ship names
Set index articles on ships